Cynthia Kaye McWilliams is an American actress, known for her performances on the television series Real Husbands of Hollywood, Prison Break, and Nashville.

Life and career
Cynthia Kaye McWilliams was born in Berlin, Germany, but moved to United States, there, raised primarily in Kansas City, Kansas. She graduated from The Theatre School at DePaul University in Chicago and later moved to Los Angeles, California. In 2005, Cynthia Kaye McWilliams landed the recurring role as Kacee Franklin, C-Note's wife, in the Fox drama series, Prison Break. The following year, she appeared in the movie The Lake House, and later co-starred in the independent films Of Boys and Men and One Small Hitch.

In 2011, Cynthia Kaye McWilliams co-starred in the short-lived Fox crime-drama series, The Chicago Code as Lilly Beauchamp. She had a voice role as Misty Knight in the 2013 video game Marvel Heroes. In 2013, she began appearing in the recurring role of attorney Trina Shaw in the BET comedy series, Real Husbands of Hollywood. In 2015, after a  decade of playing supporting roles, Cynthia Kaye McWilliams won the leading role in the NBC drama pilot, Love Is a Four Letter Word.

In 2015, Cynthia Kaye McWilliams co-starred in the video game Halo 5: Guardians as Spartan Holly Tanaka.

Filmography

References

External links

Living people
American expatriates in Germany
African-American actresses
American television actresses
American film actresses
21st-century American actresses
Actresses from Berlin
American video game actresses
American voice actresses
DePaul University alumni
Year of birth missing (living people)
21st-century African-American women
21st-century African-American people